Didi Menosi (9 May 1928 – 20 December 2013) was an Israeli writer, journalist, poet, lyricist, dramatist, columnist and satirist.

Menosi was born on Kibbutz Geva in the Jezreel Valley, at the time Mandatory Palestine. He studied literature at the Hebrew University of Jerusalem. From 1962 to 2000, his rhyming satirical column dealing with current events was published each week in the mass-circulation newspaper Yedioth Ahronoth.

In 2006, he was diagnosed with Parkinson's disease. Didi Menosi died on the morning of 20 December 2013, aged 85, at his home in Ramat Gan, Tel Aviv District, Israel. He was survived by his wife of 54 years, Tzila Menosi, and three children.

References

1928 births
2013 deaths
People from Afula
Israeli journalists
Israeli male dramatists and playwrights
Israeli lyricists
Israeli male poets
Israeli satirists
Jewish Israeli writers
Hebrew University of Jerusalem alumni
Israeli people of Polish-Jewish descent
Deaths from Parkinson's disease
Neurological disease deaths in Israel
20th-century Israeli male writers
20th-century Israeli poets
20th-century Israeli dramatists and playwrights
Jewish dramatists and playwrights